Hypercompe bricenoi is a moth of the family Erebidae first described by Walter Rothschild in 1909. It is found in Venezuela.

References

bricenoi
Moths described in 1909